Stadionul Francsic Matei is a multi-use stadium in Beiuș, Romania. It is used mostly for football matches and is the home ground of Bihorul Beiuș. The stadium holds 2,000 people.

References

Football venues in Romania
Buildings and structures in Bihor County
Beiuș